Cwm may refer to:
 Cwm (landform), a rounded, glaciated valley, also known as a corrie or cirque
 Cwm (software), a general-purpose data processor for the semantic web
 Cwm railway station, a station in Cwm, Blaenau Gwent, Wales, 1852–1963
 Cwm Rhondda, a famous Welsh hymn tune

Places 
 Cwm, Blaenau Gwent, a community in Wales
 Cwm, Llanrothal, a Jesuit gathering place in Herefordshire, England
 Cwm, Denbighshire, a community in Wales
 Cwm Cadnant, a community in Anglesey, north Wales
 Cwm Gwaun, a community in northern Pembrokeshire, Wales
 Cwm Penmachno, a community in Snowdonia, north Wales
 Western Cwm, a geographical feature on Mount Everest

Abbreviations 
 cwm (window manager) or Calm Window Manager, a stacking window manager for Unix systems
 Canadian War Museum, Canada's national museum of military history
 Cape Wine Master, a South African wine industry qualification
 Christian Witness Ministries, a non-denominational church affiliation
 Circus World Museum, a large museum complex in Baraboo, Wisconsin
 Clark–Wilson model, a model for specifying and analyzing an integrity policy for a computing system
 ClockworkMod, open source firmware for smartphones
 Comes With Music, Nokia's digital music service
 Common Warehouse Metamodel, a data warehousing specification
 Contemporary worship music, a genre of Christian music used in contemporary worship
 Contingent Workforce Management, the strategic approach to managing an organization's contingent workforce
 Council for World Mission, a worldwide community of Christian churches

See also
 Cwmbran railway station, station northeast of Cwmbran, Wales
Coombe (disambiguation)
 Coomb (disambiguation)
 Combs (disambiguation)
 Cum (disambiguation)